Erick Carlos Noriega Loret de Mola (born 22 October 2001) is a professional footballer currently playing as a defender.

Career

In 2016, Noriega signed for Shimizu S-Pulse.

Career statistics

Club
.

Notes

References

External links

2001 births
Living people
Japanese footballers
Peruvian footballers
Association football defenders
J1 League players
J2 League players
Club Alianza Lima footballers
Shimizu S-Pulse players
FC Machida Zelvia players
SV 19 Straelen players
Japanese expatriate footballers
Expatriate footballers in Germany
Japanese expatriate sportspeople in Germany